As of 1 July 2020, Uganda is divided into 135 districts plus the capital city of Kampala, which are grouped into four administrative regions. 

Since 2005, the Ugandan government has been in the process of dividing districts into smaller units. This decentralization is intended to prevent resources from being distributed primarily to chief towns and leaving the remainder of each district neglected.

Each district is further divided into counties and municipalities, and each county is further divided into sub-counties. The head elected official in a district is the chairperson of the Local Council five (usually written with a Roman numeral V).



Districts created since 2015
In September 2015, the Parliament of Uganda created 23 new districts, to be phased in over the next four years.

 

In May 2020, Parliament approved the creation of Terego District, which went into effect on 1 July 2020.

See also
 Regions of Uganda
 Uganda Local Governments Association
 ISO 3166-2 codes for Ugandan regions and districts

References

External links 
  Website of Ministry of Local Government
 Members of Parliament
 District Profile At Statoids.com
 Uganda Bureau of Statistics
 Uganda - UBOS Districts Shapefile

 
Subdivisions of Uganda
Uganda 1
Uganda 1
Districts, Uganda
Uganda geography-related lists